Tighen may refer to:
 Tighen-e Olya
 Tighen-e Sofla